Sierra Pacific may refer to:

Sierra Pacific Airlines, an airline based in Tucson, Arizona
Sierra Pacific Industries, a forest products company based in California
Sierra Pacific Synod, a council of the Evangelical Lutheran Church in America covering parts of California and Nevada
Sierra Pacific Power Company, a Nevada-based public utility and precursor to NV Energy

See also
Pacific sierra, a fish in the mackerel family